Won Hla is a Burmese politician who currently serves as an Pyithu Hluttaw MP for Nanyun Township. He is a member of the National League for Democracy.

Early life and education
Won Hla was born on 17 July 1978 in Nanyun Township, Myanmar. He is an ethnic Naga.

Political career
He is a member of the National League for Democracy. In the 2015 Myanmar general election, he was elected as an Pyithu Hluttaw member of parliament and elected representative from Nanyun Township

References

National League for Democracy politicians
1978 births
Living people
People from Sagaing Region
Naga people